Harrie Kuyten (19 December 1883 – 29 January 1952) was a Dutch painter. His work was part of the painting event in the art competition at the 1928 Summer Olympics. Kuyten's work was included in the 1939 exhibition and sale Onze Kunst van Heden (Our Art of Today) at the Rijksmuseum in Amsterdam.

References

1883 births
1952 deaths
20th-century Dutch painters
Dutch male painters
Olympic competitors in art competitions
Artists from Utrecht
20th-century Dutch male artists